This page shows the state-wise list of dams and reservoirs in India. As of July, 2019, total number of large dams in India is 5,334. About 447 large dams are under construction in India. In terms of number of dams, India ranks third after China and the United States.

Andhra Pradesh

Arunachal Pradesh

Assam

Chhattisgarh

Bihar

Goa

Gujarat
Gujarat has over 200 dams with reservoirs that are large enough to be of particular concern in disaster preparedness planning. These include:

Haryana

Himachal Pradesh

Jammu and Kashmir

Jharkhand

Karnataka

Kerala 
 

[
{
  "type": "Feature",
  "geometry": { "type": "Point", "coordinates": [77.144167,9.528611, ] },
  "properties": {
    "title": "Mullaperiyar Dam",
   "description": "",
    "marker-symbol": "dam",
    "marker-size": "large",
    "marker-color": "0050d0"
  }
},
{
  "type": "Feature",
  "geometry": { "type": "Point", "coordinates": [76.976111,9.842778 ] },
  "properties": {
    "title": "Idukki Dam",
    "description": "",
    "marker-symbol": "dam",
    "marker-size": "large",
    "marker-color": "0050d0"
  }
},
{
  "type": "Feature",
  "geometry": { "type": "Point", "coordinates": [76.966944,9.845278] },
  "properties": {
    "title": "Cheruthoni Dam",
   "description": "",
    "marker-symbol": "dam",
    "marker-size": "large",
    "marker-color": "0050d0"
  }
},
{
  "type": "Feature",
  "geometry": { "type": "Point", "coordinates": [76.896111,9.802942] },
  "properties": {
    "title": "Kulamavu Dam",
   "description": "",
    "marker-symbol": "dam",
    "marker-size": "large",
    "marker-color": "0050d0"
  }
},
{
  "type": "Feature",
  "geometry": { "type": "Point", "coordinates": [ 77.124,10.106] },
  "properties": {
    "title": "Mattupetty Dam",
   "description": "",
    "marker-symbol": "dam",
    "marker-size": "large",
    "marker-color": "0050d0"
  }
},
{
  "type": "Feature",
  "geometry": { "type": "Point", "coordinates": [76.9548034,9.962278] },
  "properties": {
    "title": "Lower Periyar Dam",
    "marker-symbol": "dam",
    "marker-size": "large",
    "marker-color": "0050d0"
  }
},
{
  "type": "Feature",
  "geometry": { "type": "Point", "coordinates": [76.9968439,9.9829676] },
  "properties": {
    "title": "Kallarkutty Dam",
    "description": "",
    "marker-symbol": "dam",
    "marker-size": "large",
    "marker-color": "0050d0"
  }
},
{
  "type": "Feature",
  "geometry": { "type": "Point", "coordinates": [76.705833,10.221667] },
  "properties": {
    "title": "Idamalayar Dam",
   "description": "",
    "marker-symbol": "dam",
    "marker-size": "large",
    "marker-color": "0050d0"
  }
},
{
  "type": "Feature",
  "geometry": { "type": "Point", "coordinates": [77.1763,10.0218] },
  "properties": {
    "title": "Anayirankal Dam",
   "description": "",
    "marker-symbol": "dam",
    "marker-size": "large",
    "marker-color": "0050d0"
  }
},
{
  "type": "Feature",
  "geometry": { "type": "Point", "coordinates": [77.19,10.14] },
  "properties": {
    "title": "Kundala Dam",
   "description": "",
    "marker-symbol": "dam",
    "marker-size": "large",
    "marker-color": "0050d0"
  }
},
{
  "type": "Feature",
  "geometry": { "type": "Point", "coordinates": [76.662222,10.136389] },
  "properties": {
    "title": "Bhoothathankettu",
   "description": "",
    "marker-symbol": "dam",
    "marker-size": "large",
    "marker-color": "0050d0"
  }
}

]
There are 44 rivers in Kerala, and 42 dams and reservoirs. The dams and reservoirs in Kerala include Solaiyar Dam, Kakkayam Dam, Idamalayar Dam, Peringalkuthu Dam and Kakki Reservoir.

Madhya Pradesh

Nevaj River Rajgarh mohanpura Dam

Manipur

Maharashtra

Mizoram

Odisha

Punjab

Rajasthan

Sikkim

Tamil Nadu

Telangana

Uttarakhand

Barrages

West Bengal

See also

 List of largest reservoirs in India
 List of lakes of India
 List of rivers of India by discharge
 Kalpasar Project
 Indian Rivers Inter-link
 Interstate River Water Disputes Act
 Irrigation in India
 National Water Policy
 Water scarcity in India
 Water supply and sanitation in India
 Water pollution in India

References

 
I
Dams and reservoirs